Gomphurus septima, or Septima's clubtail, is a species of clubtail dragonflies in the family Gomphidae.

The IUCN conservation status of Gomphurus septima is "LC", least concern, with no immediate threat to the species' survival. The population is stable. The IUCN status was reviewed in 2018.

Gomphurus septima was recently considered a member of the genus Gomphus, but in 2017 it became a member of the genus Gomphurus when Gomphurus was elevated from subgenus to genus rank.

References

 Westfall, M.L. 1956. A new species of Gonphus from Alabama (Odonata). Quart. J. Florida Acad. Sci. 19(4):251-258

Insects of the United States
Gomphidae
Taxonomy articles created by Polbot
Insects described in 1956